Francis Hurley may refer to:

 Francis Thomas Hurley (1927–2016), Roman Catholic archbishop of Anchorage
 Francis X. Hurley (1903–1976), American politician in Massachusetts